Philip or Phil Robinson may refer to:

Sports
Phil Robinson (footballer, born 1942) (1942–1989), English professional footballer
Phil Robinson (footballer, born 1967), English professional footballer
Phil Robinson (cricketer) (born 1963), English cricketer
Philip Robinson (jockey) (born 1961), English flat racing jockey

Entertainment
Phil Alden Robinson (born 1950), American film director and screenwriter
Philip Robinson (music), English conductor, arranger and music educator
Philip Robinson (author) (born 1973), English author and journalist
Phil Robinson, Australian bassist of The Cockroaches
Phil Robinson, drummer with Autopilot Off

Others

 Philip Robinson (RAF officer), decorated Royal Air Force officer
 Philip Stewart Robinson (1847–1902), Anglo-Indian writer
 Phil Robinson (politician), American politician and member of the Ohio House of Representatives
 Phil Robinson (born 1978), Faster than Barry Allen